The 2010 OFC Women's Under 20 Qualifying Tournament was an association football tournament held in New Zealand from 21 to 25 January 2010. Four teams entered the continent's tournament that served as a qualifier to the 2010 FIFA U-20 Women's World Cup. All matches were played in the North Harbour Stadium in Auckland. New Zealand won the tournament with zero goals against.

Matches

References

OFC
2010
2010
Under
OFC
2010 in youth association football